Khilanmarg is a small valley in Jammu and Kashmir, India, located about  away from the Gulmarg. The meadow, carpeted with flowers in the spring, is the site for Gulmarg's winter ski runs and offers a view of the surrounding peaks and over the Kashmir Valley. It's a  ascent from Gulmarg to Khilanmarg. The view spans from the Himalayas from Nanga Parbat to the twin  peaks of Nun and Kun to the southeast.

References
 http://www.gulmarg.org/khilanmarg/

Valleys of Jammu and Kashmir